The Seventy-second Session of the United Nations General Assembly opened on 12 September 2017. The President of the United Nations General Assembly was from the Eastern European Group.

Organisation for the session

President 
Slovakian Foreign Minister Miroslav Lajcak was elected as President of the General Assembly on 31 May 2017.

Vice-presidents 
There were twenty-one Vice-Presidents for the 72nd Session. They were:

The five permanent members of the Security Council:
 
 
 
  United Kingdom of Great Britain and Northern Ireland
  United States of America
As well as the following nations:

 Bolivia (Plurinational State of)

Committee bureaus 
The following were elected as Chairs and officers of the General Assembly committees for the 73rd Session:

First Committee (Disarmament and International Security)

Second Committee (Economic and Financial)

Third Committee (Social, Humanitarian and Cultural)

Fourth Committee (Special Political and Decolonization)

Fifth Committee (Administrative and Budgetary)

Sixth Committee (Legal)

Seat allocation 
As is tradition before each session of the General Assembly, Secretary-General António Guterres drew lots to see which Member State would occupy the first seat in the General Assembly Hall for the session, with the other Member States following according to the English translation of their name. The same order is followed in the six main committees. For this session the Czech Republic was chosen to take the first seat of the General Assembly Chamber.

General debate 

Most states had a representative speak about issues concerning their country and the hopes for the coming year regarding the actions of the General Assembly. The general debate serves as an opportunity for Member States to declare which international issues are most pressing to them. The General Debate occurred  from 19–25 September 2017, with the exception of the intervening Sunday.

The theme for the session's debate was chosen by President Miroslav Lajcak as "Focusing on People: Striving for Peace and a Decent Life for All on a Sustainable Planet."

The speaking order for the general debate was as follows:

 The President of the General Assembly: Called the meeting to order
 The Secretary-General: Introduced the “Report of the Secretary-General on the work of the Organization”
 The President of the General Assembly: Opened the general debate and made a speech
 Brazil, as per tradition, was the first Member State to speak in the general debate
 The United States of America, as the host country, was the second Member State to speak
 All other full Member States (speaking order is based on the level of representation, preference and other criteria such as geographic balance)
 Only the Holy See, the State of Palestine and the European Union are invited to participate in the general debate (speaking slots are determined by the level of representation)

A voluntary 15-minute time limit for statements is to be observed in the general debate. According to the rules in place for the General Debate, the statements should be in one of the United Nations official languages of Arabic, Chinese, English, French, Russian or Spanish, and will be translated by the United Nations translators.

Resolutions

Resolutions came before the UNGA between October 2017 and summer 2018.

The tenth emergency special session of the United Nations General Assembly was held in continuation during the tenure of this session on 21 December 2017 in regards to the status of Jerusalem. United Nations General Assembly resolution ES-10/L.22 passed by 128 votes to nine against with 21 absentees and 35 abstentions.

Elections
The election of non-permanent members to the Security Council for 2019–2020 was held on 8 June 2018, in which South Africa, Indonesia, Dominican Republic, Germany and Belgium were elected.

An election to choose 18 members of the United Nations Human Rights Council for a three-year term will take place.

References

External links
 President of the 72nd General Assembly 
 Agenda for the 72nd General Assembly

2017 in the United Nations
2018 in the United Nations
Sessions of the United Nations General Assembly